Borja Estepa Muñoz (born 24 May 1999) is a Spanish footballer who plays for Córdoba CF B as an attacking midfielder.

Club career
Born in Córdoba, Andalusia, Estepa joined Córdoba CF in 2007, aged eight. He made his senior debut with the reserves on 20 August 2016, coming on as a late substitute for Moha Traoré in a 2–0 Segunda División B away win against San Fernando CD.

On 31 August 2016, Estepa renewed his contract until 2020. On 6 September of the following year he made his first team debut, starting in a 4–2 win at Lorca FC for the season's Copa del Rey.

On 31 January 2019, Estepa was loaned to Tercera División side CA Espeleño until June.

References

External links

1999 births
Living people
Footballers from Córdoba, Spain
Spanish footballers
Footballers from Andalusia
Association football midfielders
Segunda División B players
Tercera División players
Córdoba CF B players
Córdoba CF players